Karl Emanuel Jansson (7 July 1846, in Finström – 1 June 1874, in Jomala) was a Swedish-Finnish painter, primarily of genre scenes.

Biography
His father was a farmer. He was first inspired to pursue an artistic career by the parish painter, who was teaching him to read and write. After being apprenticed to a shoemaker for a year, he quit to become the painter's assistant. As a result, he was given a scholarship to study at the Society's drawing school in Turku, which was under the management of Robert Wilhelm Ekman. Upon his arrival, Ekman arranged for lodging and provided the necessary art materials.

In 1862, he moved to Stockholm to continue his studies at the Royal Swedish Academy of Arts with Johan Fredrik Höckert. This was, however, a very slow period for the Swedish economy and he had difficulty selling his works. Finally, one of his canvases depicting the Prodigal Son was awarded a prize. In 1867, he graduated and received a state scholarship to study at the Kunstakademie Düsseldorf under Benjamin Vautier. This period was the most decisive in determining his style. He attended classes until 1872, between periods spent at home in Finström.

By this time, he had been diagnosed with tuberculosis and went to Rome, seeking a healthier climate. Finding little relief, he travelled to various health resorts, including Davos and Merano, with no improvement. After a few months spent completing his affairs in Düsseldorf, he returned home for what would be the last time.

Once there, he took up residence in Jomala with a local judge and his wife, who cared for him. On his deathbed, he learned that he had been accepted as an associate member of the Imperial Academy of Arts.

Selected paintings

References

Further reading
 Bertel Hintze, Karl Emanuel Jansson, en åländsk målare, Helsinki, Söderström, 1926
 Valdemar Nyman, Slant i håven: konstnären Karl Emanuel Jansson : en livsbild, Valdemar Society, 1993

External links

Düsseldorf Artists @ Kulta-Aika (Golden Age; scroll down for Jansson)

1846 births
1874 deaths
People from Finström
People from Turku and Pori Province (Grand Duchy of Finland)
Swedish-speaking Finns
Genre painters
19th-century Finnish painters
Finnish male painters
19th-century Finnish male artists